Michele Rosewoman (born March 19, 1953) is an American jazz pianist who leads the big band New Yor-Uba. She has worked with  Baikida Carroll, Julius Hemphill, Julian Priester, Oliver Lake, Billy Bang, Freddie Waits, Rufus Reid, Billy Hart, Reggie Workman, Celia Cruz, Chocolate Armenteros, and Paquito D'Rivera.

Early years
Rosewoman was born in Oakland, California, United States,) and is the daughter of visual artist Estera Roseman. Her parents operated an independent record shop in Walnut Creek, California, and her mother was also an arts educator. Rosewoman began playing the piano at age six. In her late teens she studied Cuban and Haitian folkloric rhythms and vocal traditions.

Discography
 The Source (Soul Note, 1984)
 Occasion to Rise (Evidence, 1993)
 Spirit (Blue Note, 1996)
 New Yor-uba, 30 Years: A Musical Celebration of Cuba in America (Self-release, 2013)

With Quintessence
 Quintessence (Enja, 1987)
 Contrast High (Enja, 1988)
 Harvest (Enja, 1993)
 Guardians of the Light (Enja, 2000)
 The In Side Out (Advance Dance Disques, 2006)

As backing musician
 Billy Bang – Rainbow Gladiator (Soul Note, 1981)
 Greg Osby — Greg Osby and Sound Theatre (JMT, 1987)
 Oliver Lake — Otherside (Gramavision, 1988)
 Andy Laster – Hippo Stomp (Sound Aspects, 1989)

References

External links
 Jazz pianist, composer and educator Michele Rosewoman, leader of Quintessence and New Yor-Uba Official Homepage
Michele Rosewoman | Jazz from New York, NY
Michele Rosewoman | Listen and Stream Free Music, Albums, New Releases, Photos, Videos

Sources
 Carr, Ian; Fairweather, Digby; Priestley, Brian. Jazz: The Rough Guide, 1995, The Rough Guides, .
 Cook, Richard, Jazz Encyclopedia. Penguin 2005, 

1953 births
Living people
Musicians from Oakland, California
Post-bop pianists
Free jazz pianists
Afro-Cuban jazz pianists
American jazz pianists
Avant-garde jazz pianists
20th-century American pianists
Jazz musicians from California
21st-century American pianists
20th-century American women pianists
21st-century American women pianists
Women jazz musicians